Cherepov is a rural locality (a khutor) in Alexeyevsky District, Belgorod Oblast, Russia. The population was 100 as of 2010. There is 1 street.

Geography 
Cherepov is located 33 km south of Alexeyevka (the district's administrative centre) by road. Bublikovo is the nearest rural locality.

References 

Rural localities in Alexeyevsky District, Belgorod Oblast
Biryuchensky Uyezd